is an active volcano located in Shikotsu-Toya National Park in Hokkaidō, Japan. It sits opposite Mount Tarumae and Mount Fuppushi on the shores of Lake Shikotsu, the caldera lake that spawned the volcanoes. Mount Eniwa is the tallest of the three volcanoes.

Eruptions
The last eruption occurred around the start of the 18th century (c. 1700 ±30 years). There are no historical records of this, but tephrochronology indicates phreatic explosions with mudflows from crater 3. Two centuries before this eruption (c. 1550 ±75 years), radiocarbon dating indicates a similar eruption from crater 2. Around the same time (c. 1500 ±150 years),  radiocarbon dating indicates another eruption, but from crater 1. This eruption included debris avalanches instead of mudflows. The oldest eruption that has been dated is an explosive eruption from the east side of the summit around 100 BCE ± 100 years according to radiocarbon dating. All these events were central vent eruptions with a volcanic explosivity index (VEI) of 2.

Climbing Route
A single trail climbs the eastern side of the mountain. It gets progressively steeper as you climb. The trail starts in a forest about one  from Poropinai. From there the terrain is rocky and alpine. The climb takes 3-3.5 hours.

1972 Winter Olympics
At the 1972 Winter Olympics, Mount Eniwa was the site of the men's and women's downhill ski races. The course started at the summit and finished on the southwest slope. The technical events of giant slalom and slalom were held at Teine.

Notes

References
 Geographical Survey Institute
 Paul Hunt, Hiking in Japan: An Adventurer's Guide to the Mountain Trails, Tokyo, Kodansha International Ltd., 1988.  and  C0075
 Robert Storey, North-East Asia on a Shoestring, Singapore, Lonely Planet Publications, 3rd Edition March 1992.

External links 
 
 Eniwadake - Japan Meteorological Agency 
  - Japan Meteorological Agency
 Eniwa Dake - Geological Survey of Japan
 Shikotsu: Global Volcanism Program - Smithsonian Institution

Venues of the 1972 Winter Olympics
Olympic alpine skiing venues
Eniwa
Eniwa
Eniwa
Eniwa
Shikotsu-Tōya National Park
Holocene stratovolcanoes